Achille Campanile (28 September 1899–4 January 1977) was an Italian writer, playwright, journalist and television critic known for his surreal humour and word play.

Biography
Campanile was born in Rome in 1899. He contributed to the newspapers La tribuna, L'Idea Nazionale and the satirical magazine Il Travaso delle idee. In 1925 he published his first theatre work entitled L’inventore del cavallo which was a single act play.

Works
 Ma che cos'è questo amore (1924)
 Se la luna mi porta fortuna (1927)
 Agosto, moglie mia non-ti conosco (1930)
 In campagna è un'altra cosa (1931)
 Cantilena all'angolo della strada (1933)
 Celestino e la famiglia Gentilissimi (1942)
 Il povero Piero (1959)
 Amiamoci in fretta (1962)
 L'inventore del cavallo e altre quindici commedie (1971)
 Manuale di conversazione (1973)
 Asparagi e immortalità dell'anima (1974)
 Vite degli uomini illustri (1975)
 L'eroe (1976)
 Tragedie in due battute (1978)

References

External links

Italian dramatists and playwrights
Italian male journalists
Italian television critics
Italian humorists
1899 births
1977 deaths
Writers from Rome
Viareggio Prize winners
20th-century Italian dramatists and playwrights
Italian male dramatists and playwrights
20th-century Italian male writers
20th-century Italian journalists